The legislature in the U.S. state of Utah has designated a system of Utah Scenic Byways in addition to the National Scenic Byways that are defined within the state. Some of the state designated routes overlap with the federal designations. The Utah Department of Transportation has signed both the state and federal designations with a Scenic Byway plaque directly below the route number. The byway system is defined at Utah Administrative Code section R926-13. The state has also designated some local, county and Forest Service roads as Scenic Backways.

National Scenic Byways in Utah

State designated scenic byways

See also

References

External links
Utah-- National Scenic Byways Program by U.S. Department of Transportation
Utah Scenic Byways by Utah Office of Tourism
Utah Scenic Byways by Utah Travel Industry

 
Scenic byways